is a Japanese manga series by Akira Oze. It was adapted into a live-action television series in 1994.

The story centers around Natsuko Saeki, a young woman trying to break into sake making, a business that's traditionally carried out by men.

A prequel to the story by the same author, Natsu no Kura, tells the story of Natsuko's grandmother, Natsu.

Plot 
Natsuko Saeki, a young woman working for an advertising company in Tokyo, returns to her family's home in the countryside. There she finds her brother, Yasuo, searching for a "phantom" rice seed called tatsunishiki, rumored to create a new form of sake. He finds the seeds, but after he passes away suddenly, Natsuko quits her job and begins working at the sake brewery to realize Yasuo's dream of making the best sake in Japan.

Characters
Natsuko Saeki
Played by Emi Wakui

Wataru Kusakabe
Played by Masato Hagiwara

Saeko Hashimoto
Played by Yuki Matsushita

Kazuko Saeki
Played by Mayumi Wakamura

Gen
Played by Hatsuo Yamaya

Araki
Played by Ken Ishiguro

Shizue Tanaka
Played by Mayumi Hasegawa

Yasuo Saeki
Played by Kiichi Nakai

References

External links

1994 Japanese television series debuts
1994 Japanese television series endings
Japanese television dramas based on manga
1988 manga
Alcohol in popular culture
Seinen manga
Fuji TV dramas